Smooth Talker (literally "Harmony Is Precious") is a 2015 Hong Kong romantic comedy television drama created and produced by TVB, starring  Joe Ma and Kate Tsui as the main leads, with Johnson Lee, Elena Kong, Tommy Wong and Tracy Chu in main supporting roles. Filming took place from Augusts till November 2014.  The drama aired on Hong Kong's Jade and HD Jade channels March 30 till April 24, 2015 every Monday through Friday during its 9:30-10:30 pm timeslot with a total of 20 episodes.

Synopsis
Hau Tak-sze (Joe Ma) has inherited his late father's social club, besides managing the club he also works full-time as a court mediator. He meets Mo Sui-yee (Kate Tsui), who is in the process of divorcing her cheating ex-husband, during one of his cases. Sui-yee moves into her cousin Lam Ah-lui's (Elena Kong) home during her divorce, she soon finds out that her ex-husband's lover also lives in the same building as her cousin. Since Tak-sze visits the building frequently Sui-yee thinks both him and her ex-husband's lover are in cohorts together to try to gain her property from her divorce.

Mo Sui-yee gets a job at Au Yeung-ai's (Johnson Lee) law office, Tak-sze also visits the law office frequently because he is best friends with Yeung-ai. Through her boss and new job, Sui-yee learns that Tak-sze is truly a nice guy who works hard at his job.

Cast

Main cast
Joe Ma as Hau Tak-sze (侯德仕), Pronunciation similar as "So many things" or "Busy for the extra" and "Toast".
Kate Tsui as Mo Sui-yee (巫瑞薏), Pronunciation same as "Sleepless"
Johnson Lee as Au Yeung-ai (歐陽繼)
Elena Kong as Lam Ah-lui (林亞磊)

Supporting cast
Tommy Wong as Au Yeung-bin (歐陽邊)
Tracy Chu as Mo Sui-ka (巫瑞嘉)
Jacqueline Wong as Angie Hu (胡姿柏; Wu Zi-baak)
Nathan Ngai as Jason Wong (黃柱樑; Wong Cyu-loeng)
Quinn Ho as Yau Sai-wu (游西湖), Pronunciation same as "Travel around Xihu"
William Chak as Chung Kwok-wai (鍾國威), Pronunciation same as "China is very powerful"
Eddie Pang *Peng Huaian as Che Ming-zan (車鳴震), Pronunciation similar as "Che Chan", which means having sex in car.
Joe Junior as Mak Ming-ming (麥明明), Pronunciation similar as Hong Kong's famous female Feng-shui Specialist Mak Ling Ling. 
Carat Cheung as Betty So (蘇花兒; Sou Faa-ji), Pronunciation same as "coquettish flower", the really means in Chinese would be Slut
Stefan Wong as Wan Siu-lung (溫少龍), Pronunciation similar as Less making money in Cantonese Slang.
Raymond Chiu as Wan Tin-gong (尹天江), Pronunciation similar as Finding something a whole day.
Pat Poon as Wu Gwai-wing (胡貴榮)
Patrick Dunn as David Lee (李明達; Lei Ming-Daat)
Hugo Wong as Wu Ming-gei (胡銘基)
Shally Tsang as Wat Wong Ming-chu (屈黃明珠)
Chloe Nguyen (阮兒) as Tong Jeoi (唐蕊)
Jack Hui as Gwai Tau-ying (鬼頭鷹) 
MoMo Wu as Lai Lee Chi-chun (賴李至珍)
Eileen Yeow as Wu Yiu Bik-san (胡姚碧珊)
Suet Nei as Chung Yan-giu (鍾欣嬌)
Rocky Cheng as Bei Yuen-fat (費潤發)
Sam Tsang as Buk Chi-tou (卜智濤)
Yu Chi Ming as Lee Yut-suan (李乙迅)
Alan Mak as Ngai Bak-ho (倪柏豪)
Even Chan as Ga Sau-man (賈秀文)
King Kong Lam as Yan Chi-chung (甄子聰)
Ngai Wai Man as Wong Ging (黃勁)
Otto Wong as Dai Din (大癲)
Ocean Wong as Wu Ming-fung (胡銘鋒)
Jimmy Au as Hau Ye (侯爺)
Chan Dick Hark as Ngan Gin-sheh (眼鏡蛇)
Leo Tsang as Wah Suk (華叔)
Man Yeung as

Cameo appearance
Rebecca Zhu

Development

A promo image of Smooth Talker was featured in TVB's 2015 calendar for the month of May. 
The costume fitting ceremony was held on August 26, 2014 12:30 pm at Tseung Kwan O TVB City Studio One.
The plot for Smooth Talker was first unveiled at "TVB Sales Presentation 2015" held in November 2014.
Filming of the drama began in August 2014 and ended in November 2014.
In October 2014 co-star Tracy Chu suffered a heat stroke during the midst of filming.

Viewership ratings

Awards and nominations

International Broadcast
  - 8TV (Malaysia), 10 February 2017

References

External links
Official website 

TVB dramas
2015 Hong Kong television series debuts
2015 Hong Kong television series endings